Superball or Super ball may refer to: 

 Super Ball, a toy bouncing ball based on a type of synthetic rubber invented in 1964 by chemist Norman Stingley 
 Superball Music, a German independent record label 
 Superball+,  an EP from American indie rock band Helium 
 Superball Arcade, a purchasable shareware computer game for PC

See also 

 Super Bowl